Jonathan Marc (born 12 January 1988 in Lannion) is a French slalom canoeist who has competed at the international level since 2005.

He won a bronze medal in the C1 team event at the 2013 ICF Canoe Slalom World Championships in Prague.

References

External links
 
 Jonathan MARC at CanoeSlalom.net

1988 births
French male canoeists
Living people
People from Lannion
Medalists at the ICF Canoe Slalom World Championships
Sportspeople from Côtes-d'Armor